Queen O' Spades is the third EP by the Burden Brothers. It was released in 2002 on Last Beat Records.  The disc was sold in a package along with a t-shirt, shotglass, and stickers on the band's website.  This EP features former Guns N' Roses members Izzy Stradlin and Duff McKagan and Pearl Jam drummer Matt Cameron.

Track listing
 "Walk Away" (Lewis, Bentley) – 2:56
 "Queen O' Spades" (Lewis, Bentley) – 4:24
 "400 Bucks" (Reverend Horton Heat) – 3:59
 "Walk (Very Far) Away" (Lewis, Bentley) – 4:43
 "Queen O' Spaces [Clean]" (Lewis, Bentley) – 4:25
 "400 (More) Bucks" (Reverend Horton Heat) – 3:55

Personnel
 Vaden Lewis - vocals and guitar
 Mike Rudnicki - guitar
 Mark Hughes - bass guitar
 Casey Orr - bass
 Joe Butcher - pedal steel guitar
 Zach Blair - guitar
 Josh Daugherty - guitar
 James Kirkland - guitar
 Taz Bentley - backing vocals, drums, percussion, and guitar
 Izzy Stradlin - guitar (on "Walk Away")
 Duff "Rose" McKagan - bass guitar (on "Walk Away")
 Matt Cameron - drums (on "Walk Away")
 Stuart Hallerman - engineer
 Paul Williams - engineer, mixing

Burden Brothers albums
2002 EPs